Southside High School or South Side High School may refer to:

Southside High School (Gadsden, Alabama)
Southside High School (Dallas County, Alabama), a school in the Dallas County Schools system
Southside High School (Batesville, Arkansas)
South Side High School (Bee Branch, Arkansas)
Southside High School (Fort Smith, Arkansas)
South Side High School (Fort Wayne, Indiana)
Southside High School (Muncie, Indiana)
Southside High School (Louisiana), Youngsville, Louisiana
Malcolm X Shabazz High School or South Side High School, Newark, New Jersey
Southside High School (Elmira, New York)
South Side High School (Rockville Centre, New York)
Southside High School (North Carolina), Chocowinity, North Carolina
South Side High School (Hookstown, Pennsylvania)
South Side High School (Pittsburgh, Pennsylvania)
Southside High School (Greenville, South Carolina)
South Side High School (Jackson, Tennessee)
South Side High School (Memphis, Tennessee)
Southside High School (Texas), San Antonio, Texas

See also
 South High School (disambiguation)